Ian Wickson (19 April 1955 – 24 July 2012) was  a former Australian rules footballer who played with Footscray in the Victorian Football League (VFL).

Notes

External links 
		

1955 births
2012 deaths
Australian rules footballers from Victoria (Australia)
Western Bulldogs players